Romāns Kvačovs (born 17 January 1980) is a Latvian football manager. He was appointed as the head coach of the Latvia women's national football team in August 2021.

References

External links
 

1980 births
Living people
Latvian football managers
Women's national association football team managers
Latvia women's national football team
Football managers in Latvia